He Died with a Felafel in His Hand is a purportedly non-fiction autobiographical novel by Australian author John Birmingham about his experiences as a share housing tenant, first published in 1994 by The Yellow Press. The story consists of a collection of colourful anecdotes about living in share houses in Brisbane and other cities in Australia with variously dubious housemates. The title refers to a deceased heroin addict found in one such house. The book was subsequently adapted into the longest running stage play in Australian history and, in 2001, was made into a film by Richard Lowenstein, starring Noah Taylor, Emily Hamilton and Sophie Lee. A sequel, The Tasmanian Babes Fiasco, was published in 1998.

In 2004, to celebrate the book's tenth anniversary, Birmingham approached comic artist Ryan Vella to produce a graphic novel of the book. The pair met in April of that year at Artspace Mackay, for the opening of the Headspace exhibition. The comic was published in September 2004 by Duffy & Snellgrove. Paul Dawson calls this a grunge lit book.

Synopsis
While the book is not written in a linear fashion the order of houses (and housemates) John lives in is as follows:

1st Place – The Boulevade

 Tom lives in the garage
 Mel lives upstairs. Her boyfriend Warren moved in some time later. When they moved out, replaced by
 Andy the med student (nicknamed "Dr Death") moves in
Tom moves out and is replaced by:
 Derek the bank clerk

2nd Place
 Tom and John got a new place
 Derek the bank clerk (lived in a tent). Replaced by
 Martin the paranoid wargames enthusiast. Lasted three weeks and was replaced by
 Taylor the taxi driver

3rd Place – King Street
 PJ
 Milo
 PJ moved out, replaced by
 The 7 ft nurse, replaced by
 Ray, replaced by
 Malcolm and his Charlie Brown-themed bowls, replaced by
 Victor the Rastafarian, replaced by
 McGann the American in his mid 40s with a fondness for prostitutes, replaced by
 Taylor the taxi driver.
Taylor at the time was having personal issues. He ambushed his fellow housemates with a toy gun after hiding for an hour. He told them if it was a real gun they would all be dead. John saw this as good reason to move out.

4th Place – Duke Street (Brisbane)
 "Thunderbird Ron"
 Macgyver the mushroom farmer
 Neal the albino moontanner
 Howie (Neal's friend)
 Satomi Tiger (via Tim the invisible flatmate)
 "Brainthrust" Leonard
 Jabba the Hutt
 Mick the English backpacker
 Colin and Stepan
John moves out for reasons not made clear.

5th Place – Melbourne
 Stacey the Who Weekly fan
John moves out when her loud sex sessions became too much to bear.

6th Place – Fitzroy
 Brain the electrician
 Greg the gay school teacher
 AJ
 Satvia who starts going out with John
 Nigel moves into the house and moves in with Satvia
As a result of the fallout from this new relationship Greg moves out and John follows suit.

7th Place – Carlton
 Ernie
 Martin the Canadian PhD student
 Dave the smoker moves in with his washerwoman girlfriend
 Four other Daves move in
After trying to freeze out the Daves from the house by cutting off the gas and electricity John gives in and moves to a loft in Fitzroy.

8th Place – Fitzroy
 Wendell the Londoner
After Wendell's threats to kill him, John moves out and sleeps around at friends' places.

9th Place – Auchenflower in Brisbane
 Wayne the Satanic vet
 Danny (the decoy)
 Margot

10th Place – Brisbane goth house (not clear how this move came about)
 Kevin the carpenter
 Slovenian art printer
 Bald goth who lived in the back
 Luke the musician
All the goths run away after the bailiff came round to collect unpaid rent. John keeps the house on and in moves:

 Dirk
 Em the banker (however at the start of the book it is stated that Emma moves in when Nina moves out)
 "Crazy Nina"
Nina move out to live with her friend Tanya
 Tanya then moves in after Nina sleeps with her boyfriend. The whole house moves:

11th Place
 Dirk
 Em the banker
 Tanya (possibly)
 New woman moves in to replace Nina but leaves because she is "diagnosed as schizo"
 Taylor the taxi driver moves in
The book then segues to

12th Place – band house in Darlinghurst, Sydney
 Hooper
 Tammy
 Jeremy moves in to escape his former psychotic housemate
 Keith the drummer moves in downstairs

13th Place – Kippax street
 Gina
 Harry the doctor, replaced by
 Kim the vet, replaced by
 "Melissa the junkie" (aka Rowan Corcoran), replaced by
 Duffy the computer programmer, replaced by
 The Dutch guy who lasted 2 weeks, replaced by
 Giovanna who lasted less than a week, replaced by
 Mosman who no one ever saw, replaced by
 Jimbo who moved in with one of the girls leaving his room free for
 Veronica the proto hippy who was replaced by
 Jonathan, replaced by
 "Downstairs Ivan"
 "Uptight Martin" moved in at the same time
Downstairs Ivan and Uptight Martin move out within 3 days of each other and are replaced by
 Paul the quiet journalist and
 Homer the air traffic controller
 Yoko San moved in and last three weeks, replaced by
 Jeffrey the "junkie" (drug addict)

Birmingham's narrative is interspersed with humorous testimonials from other veterans of the Australian share house lifestyle, and descriptions of common share house paraphernalia, such as the bucket bong, the ubiquitous "brown couch", and milk crates serving as makeshift furniture.

References

1994 Australian novels
Australian novels adapted into films
Australian comedy novels
Novels set in Australia
Grunge lit
Novels set in Melbourne
Novels set in Brisbane
Novels set in Sydney